Henri Durville (1887–1963), son of Hector Durville professed in his school which he called “the principles of dynamic physics” in which he showed the difference between animal magnetism and hypnotism. His studies were extremely advanced, and according to Francois Ribadeau-Dumas, in his book “History of the Magic stick” he claims that the studies of Henri Durville opened new horizons, specially in his investigations regarding somnambulism and the action in central nerves.

“Will goes along with Destiny as a directive potency of our evolution” (Durville, Henri).

Books and publications
 Cours de Magnétisme personnel. 1920
 La Suggestion thérapeutique. 1922
 Les francs-masons. 1923
 Dieu les hommes. 1928
  1961
 Le Pouvoir Magnétique. 1960
 Le Pouvoir magnétique.... 1, L'Égypte, berceau du magnétisme. 1961
 Les portes du Temple. 1931
 Les vivants et les morts. 1922
 Sorts et enchantements. 1956
 Thérapeutique magnétique. 1953
 Vers la sagesse. 1922
 Victoire sur le mal, voici la lumière. 1921

External links
 Cours the Magnétisme Personnel - digitized copy of original Henri Durville's work

French hypnotists
French occultists
1963 deaths
1887 births
20th-century occultists